The Real World: San Francisco is the third season of MTV's reality television series The Real World, which focuses on a group of diverse strangers living together for several months in a different city each season, as cameras follow their lives and interpersonal relationships.  It is the second season of The Real World to be filmed in the Pacific States region of the United States, specifically in California after The Real World: Los Angeles.

The season featured a total of eight cast members over the course of the season, as one cast member was evicted and replaced. This is the first season to be filmed in San Francisco, a location later used in the twenty-ninth season, The Real World: Ex-Plosion.

The Real World: San Francisco is noteworthy for the depiction of Pedro Zamora's struggle with AIDS, and his and other cast members' confrontations with David "Puck" Rainey, which led to Rainey's eviction. These conflicts provided what Entertainment Weekly called emotional high points for the season, and are credited with making The Real World a hit. It was ranked #7 on Time magazine's list of 32 Epic Moments in Reality-TV History. The season is also notable for featuring the first-ever same-sex commitment ceremony on TV, between Zamora and his partner, Sean Sasser.

Casting
This season was the first to feature a castmember, Pedro Zamora, dealing with a life-threatening illness. Future seasons would feature castmembers dealing with other illnesses, such as Lyme disease and cystic fibrosis. This is also the first season to feature an Asian American, Pam Ling, and two Hispanic Americans, Pedro Zamora and Rachel Campos.

Singer Jewel stated in a 2017 interview that she was offered an opportunity to be a cast member but declined, fearing it would be the wrong path for her career.

Casting was completed by January 1994, by which time the cast was informed that one of their housemates would be HIV-positive, though they did not learn which one it was until the day they moved into their Russian Hill house, on February 12, 1994. The cast was filmed until they moved out on June 19. The season premiered on June 30 of that year and consisted of 20 episodes.

The residence
The cast lived in a house at 949 Lombard Street in San Francisco, California from February 12 to June 19, 1994. The house is located between Leavenworth Street and Jones Street, one block east of the eight sharp turns that have earned the street the distinction of being "the crookedest street in the United States". Production renovated the third and fourth floors of the building for filming. A June 8, 2000 fire caused approximately $2 million in damage to the house. Several years after the fire, the building was completely renovated, and bears only a slight resemblance to its appearance in 1994. The renovations include a second garage on the east side of the house, atop of which sits a patio.

Cast

: Age at the time of filming.

Duration of cast 

Notes
Puck was kicked out of the house in Episode 11 after all of his cast members voted him out of the house.
Jo replaced Puck in Episode 14.
Puck makes appearances in Episodes 13, 14, 19 and 20.

Episodes

After filming

Pedro Zamora fell ill and was hospitalized in New York in October 1994. He was eventually flown to Miami, and was diagnosed with progressive multifocal leukoencephalopathy, or PML. He received a phone call from President Bill Clinton, who thanked him for his work, and helped facilitate emigration of his older brothers, who were flown to Miami from Cuba, reuniting them for the first time in 14 years. A benefit was held to pay for his medical expenses, at which President Clinton praised Pedro. MTV began a trust in order to pay for Zamora's medical costs, as he had no medical insurance. Zamora died on November 11, 1994, hours after the debut airing of the season finale. The money from the benefit was used to form the Pedro Zamora Memorial Fund. His best friend and roommate, Judd Winick, began to lecture on HIV/AIDS and safe sex for him, and did so for three years.

The 1995 reunion show, The Real World Reunion, which assembled the casts from the first four seasons of The Real World, was marked by antagonism between Puck and his former castmates. Though some members of the audience and the other seasons' casts expressed interest or fascination with Puck and his antics, his confrontation with his former roommate, Mohammed, resulted in Puck's distancing himself from Mohammed physically, and harsh words from others on the stage, such as second season cast member Irene Berrera-Kearns, led to him temporarily leaving the studio.

During his subsequent career writing comic books, Judd has explored LGBT issues, including storylines involving gay bashing, HIV and AIDS, in books such as Green Lantern and Green Arrow. He also chronicled his friendship with Zamora in his 2000 autobiographical graphic novel, Pedro and Me: Friendship, Loss and What I Learned. Judd and Pam, who fell in love during the vigil they kept over Pedro, married in 2001, and as of 2008, have two children.

Rachel Campos appeared on Road Rules: All Stars, where she met Sean Duffy of the Real World: Boston cast. They eventually married, and as of May 2016, have eight children. They live in Ashland, Wisconsin, where Sean was a District Attorney of Ashland County before being elected to Congress in 2010. She welcomed her ninth child, a daughter, Valentina StellaMaris on October 1, 2019. Campos also appeared in The Wedding Video, a 2002 spoof of The Real World written and directed by The Real World: New York alumnus Norman Korpi, which starred ten alumni of various Real World seasons.

Puck Rainey made a cameo appearance on Road Rules: All Stars, and competed on Battle of the Sexes, during which he came into conflict with David Edwards of The Real World: Los Angeles, and married on camera Betty, his fiancée and mother of his sons, Bogart and Rocco. As of 2008, he was working as a truck driver. As of 2009, the family lives in Alabama, where Rainey makes a living through public appearances and miscellaneous jobs. In his spare time, he enjoys gardening and photography, though he prefers to model, whereas his partner works behind the camera. Spanky Ham, one of the main characters on the animated reality television spoof Drawn Together has been compared by that show's creators to Rainey.

At the 2008 The Real World Awards Bash, Pedro and Sean received a nomination for "Favorite Love Story", Pedro also received a nomination for "Best Fight" with Puck, the latter was in the running for the "Roommate You Love to Hate" award, and in the "Gone Baby Gone" category.

As of 2008, Cory Murphy is a mother of two and a teacher of middle-school Spanish and language arts.

A 2008 film by Nick Oceano, Pedro, chronicles Zamora's life.

Pedro's widower, Sean Sasser, continued his activism for LGBT issues, and his work as an HIV educator. In 1995, he spoke at the inaugural White House AIDS conference, and was appointed by President Bill Clinton to the Presidential Advisory Council on HIV/AIDS. He moved to Atlanta in late 1995, in order to be with his boyfriend, and hoped to open a café. He was later a pastry chef at Ritz-Carlton hotel properties and head pastry chef at a luxury hotel in Portland before settling in Washington DC in 2012, where, as a pastry chef at a restaurant called RIS, he was praised by the Washington Blade for his work there. In June 2013 Sasser married Michael Kaplan, whom he had dated off and on since the 1990s, and with whom he had moved in six months prior.  While in Washington, Sasser served as a board member of the AIDS Alliance for Children, Youth and Families. He was active in youth and mentoring organizations, and he and Kaplan served as foster parents to a 4-year-old girl. In July 2013, Sasser, who had also been HIV positive for 25 years, was diagnosed with mesothelioma, a rare cancer of the lungs. He died at his home on August 7, 2013, at the age of 44. He is survived by his mother, Patricia Sasser of Detroit, and a younger sister.

The Challenge

Bold indicates the contestant was a finalist on The Challenge.

Notes

References

External links
Official site at MTV.com
The Real World: San Francisco: Meet the Cast. MTV.com

San Francisco
Television shows set in San Francisco
HIV/AIDS in television
1994 American television seasons
Russian Hill, San Francisco
Television in the San Francisco Bay Area